Platycaulos is a group of plants in the Restionaceae described as a genus in 1984. The genus is native to Africa including Madagascar.

 Species

References

Restionaceae
Poales genera